The Drug Tariff, also known as Drug Tariff price, is that amount that the NHS repays pharmacies for generic prescription medications. It differs from prescription charges which are £9.35 per item/drug as of 2021 unless exemptions apply.

They are published monthly and used as a reference in England and Wales by pharmacists or doctors dispensing in primary care.  It covers such issues as the costs of prescription payments for patients, costs of appliances and blacklisted medicines.

See also
Pharmacopeia
Pharmacy
Royal Pharmaceutical Society of Great Britain

References

External links 
 NHS Drug Tariff (England & Wales)

Pharmacy in the United Kingdom
National Health Service (England)
NHS Wales